A list of the films produced in Mexico in 1975 (see 1975 in film):

External links

1975
Films
Mexican